Tashan may refer to:

Geography

Bahrain
Tashan, Bahrain, village in Bahrain

China
Mount Ta (Yantai) (塔山; pinyin: Tǎshān), a tourist site in Zhifu District, Yantai, Shandong
Tashan Township (塌山乡), a town in Kuancheng Manchu Autonomous County, Hebei
Tashan, Ganyu District (塔山镇), a town in Ganyu District, Jiangsu
Tashan, Jiangsu (塔山镇), in a town in Jiawang District, Xuzhou, Jiangsu

Iran
Tashan, Khuzestan, a village in Khuzestan Province
Tashan, Bushehr, a village in Bushehr Province
Tashan District, Behbahan County, Khuzestan Province
Tashan Rural District, Jam County, Bushehr Province

Turkey
Taşhan, Mut, in Mersin Province, Turkey

Other uses
Tashan (film), a 2008 Indian film
Battle of Tashan (塔山爭奪戰), a 1948 battle fought in Liaoning
Seyfi Tashan (born 1925), Turkish publisher

See also

Tashaun Gipson, an American football player
Tayshaun Prince, an American basketball executive